Le Plessis-Belleville is a commune in the Oise department in northern France.

See also
 Communes of the Oise department

References

External links

 Communes of the Picardie region

Communes of Oise